is a Japanese manga series by Kyoko Hikawa which first ran in LaLa from 2005 to 2006. Later it was transferred to Melody where it continued to be published until 2016. There are eleven volumes published so far: vol. 2 was ranked 7 on the Tohan Comics Ranking (2006/11/5～11/11) and vol. 3 was ranked 9 (2007/9/2～9/8).

This is the latest work from the author, since Kanata Kara, and is her first work with historical background, in this case the Japanese Sengoku era. According to Kyoko Hikawa's website it's her first work in which the author's hobby for Japanese WA was useful.

Plot

On the Sengoku era, the heroine Suzu is a girl who is continuously sought by spirits (mononoke). However, she has mastered techniques to protect herself, which she learned from the late Shinkurou, the man she calls "Toto-sama". One day during a trip she encounters an unknown spirit; her powers awaken and activate the power of the flute she carries as Shinkurou's memento. An unknown man who reminds her of Toto-sama appears before her eyes and the spirit is defeated.

External links
 

Shōjo manga
Josei manga
Hakusensha manga